Yakassé-Attobrou Department is a department of La Mé Region in Lagunes District, Ivory Coast. In 2021, its population was 105,986 and its seat is the settlement of Yakassé-Attobrou. The sub-prefectures of the department are Abongoua, Biéby, and Yakassé-Attobrou.

History
Yakassé-Attobrou Department was created in 2008 as a second-level division via a split-off from Adzopé Department. At its creation, it was part of Agnéby Region.

In 2011, districts were introduced as new first-level subdivisions of Ivory Coast. At the same time, regions were reorganised and became second-level subdivisions and all departments were converted into third-level subdivisions. At this time, Yakassé-Attobrou Department became part of La Mé Region in Lagunes District.

Notes

Departments of La Mé
2008 establishments in Ivory Coast
States and territories established in 2008